The asymmetrical goatfish (Upeneus asymmetricus) is a species of marine ray-finned fish, a goatfish from the family Mullidae which is found in Indo-West Pacific. This species can reach a length of  TL. Asymmetrical goatfish is a good food fish.

References

asymmetricus
Fish described in 1954